The Hillsboro Peak Lookout Tower and Cabin, in Gila National Forest in Sierra County, New Mexico, is a forest fire lookout tower and cabin with one or both built in 1925.  The combination was listed on the National Register of Historic Places in 1988.

Hillsboro Peak has elevation , and is in southwestern New Mexico's Black Range.

The lookout tower, in a 2007 photo, appears to be different than the 1920s tower.

The log cabin is reportedly available for public use overnight.

References

Fire lookout towers on the National Register of Historic Places in New Mexico
National Register of Historic Places in Sierra County, New Mexico
Buildings and structures completed in 1925